Nikita den Boer (born 8 January 1991) is a Dutch wheelchair racer. She won the bronze medal in the women's marathon T54 event at the 2020 Summer Paralympics held in Tokyo, Japan.

In 2020, she won the women's wheelchair race at the London Marathon in London, United Kingdom.

Career 

In 2014, she became an ambassador of the Johan Cruyff Foundation which aims to improve sport opportunities for children with disabilities.

She finished in 8th place in the women's wheelchair race at the 2019 London Marathon in London, United Kingdom. In the same year, she broke the Dutch national women's 5000 metres T54 at a race in Switzerland, and finished in 4th place in the women's 5000 metres T54 event at the 2019 World Para Athletics Championships held in Dubai, United Arab Emirates. It was her first race at a global tournament. Den Boer won the 2020 London Marathon in October 2020. As a result, she qualified to represent the Netherlands at the 2020 Summer Paralympics in Tokyo, Japan.

In 2021, she won the silver medal in the women's 1500 metres T54 and women's 5000 metres T54 events at the World Para Athletics European Championships held in Bydgoszcz, Poland. She also won the bronze medal in the women's 800 metres T54 event.

At the 2020 Summer Paralympics in Tokyo, Japan, she won the bronze medal in the women's marathon T54 event. She also finished in 4th place in the women's 5000 metres T54 event with a new personal best of 11:15.37. She finished in 7th place in the women's 1500 metres T54 event.

Personal life 

She lives in Haarlem, Netherlands.

Achievements

References

External links 
 

Living people
1991 births
Dutch female wheelchair racers
Sportspeople from Haarlem
Medalists at the World Para Athletics Championships
Medalists at the World Para Athletics European Championships
People with spina bifida
Athletes (track and field) at the 2020 Summer Paralympics
Paralympic athletes of the Netherlands
Medalists at the 2020 Summer Paralympics
Paralympic bronze medalists for the Netherlands
Paralympic medalists in athletics (track and field)
20th-century Dutch women
21st-century Dutch women